Epitausa coppryi is a species of moth in the family Erebidae. It is found in North America.

The MONA or Hodges number for Epitausa coppryi is 8581.1.

References

Further reading

 
 
 

Eulepidotinae
Articles created by Qbugbot
Moths described in 1852